Brenda Gibbs (born 3 September 1947) is an Australian politician. Gibbs was elected to the Australian Senate for Queensland in 1996, representing the Australian Labor Party. Her first term began on 1 July 1996, she was not re-elected at the 2001 Australian federal election, and her term expired on 30 June 2002.

Gibbs' husband Bob Gibbs had been a Queensland ALP Minister for all but two years between 1989 and 1999 and had a stint as Queensland ALP President in 1995.

References

 

1947 births
Living people
Australian Labor Party members of the Parliament of Australia
Members of the Australian Senate
Members of the Australian Senate for Queensland
Women members of the Australian Senate
21st-century Australian politicians
21st-century Australian women politicians
20th-century Australian politicians
English emigrants to Australia
20th-century Australian women politicians